The Delmira Agustini Medal is a civil decoration of Uruguay whose purpose is to honor those citizens, natural or legal, and foreign personalities who contribute or have contributed significantly to culture and the arts who, in the opinion of the Ministry of Education and Culture of Uruguay, deserve such recognition. The medal was created on 4 January 2013 and was named after Uruguayan poetess Delmira Agustini.

History 
The Delmira Agustini Medal was created by Law No. 19,050 of 4 January 2013, that also put in charge of the Ministry of Education and Culture the decision of who will be awarded, to perform the presentation of the decoration and also ordered that the Executive Branch through the Ministry of Education and Culture to regulate all other matters related to the medal.

Decree No. 123/013 of 23 April 2013 further regulated the aforementioned law.

Appearance 
The medal was named after poetess Delmira Agustini. It is made of copper, minted on its obverse and engraved on its reverse with a cover of old silver. It is circular-shaped with a diameter of 40 millimeters and three millimeters of thickness. It is delivered in a case.

On its obverse it depicts a low relief engraving of the figure of Delmira Agustini, surrounded by an "art nouveau" decoration. On its reverse is engraved the text "En reconocimiento a la contribución a la cultura y las artes. Ministerio de Educación y Cultura. República Oriental del Uruguay" ("In recognition of the contribution to culture and the arts. Ministry of Education and Culture. Eastern Republic of Uruguay").

Eligibility and appointment 
The medal is awarded by the Minister of Education and Culture to citizens (natural or legal) as well as to foreigners who have notably contributed to culture and the arts in any of its aspects, which in the opinion of the Ministry of Education and Culture deserves the recognition.

The presentation is performed in an act, public or private, without having to comply with any formality or protocol other than that the recipient meets the requirements to be awarded and the person presenting the award is able to do so. After that, the Ministry of Education and Culture will register in the registry of the medal, managed by the National Directorate of Culture of this Ministry, who are being decorated with the medal.

Recipients

See also 

 Orders, decorations, and medals of Uruguay
 Culture of Uruguay

References 

Civil awards and decorations of Uruguay